William Frank Hillenbrand (March 29, 1922July 17, 1994) was an American football halfback who played professionally in the All-America Football Conference (AAFC). He was born in Armstrong, Indiana. He attended Indiana University, where he played for the Hoosiers. In 1942, he was a consensus All-American, having been selected as a first-team All-American halfback by the United Press, Sporting News, Central Press Association, NEA wire service, Collier's Weekly, New York Sun, and Walter Camp Football Foundation.  He was drafted by the New York Giants in the 1st round (6th pick overall) in the 1944 NFL Draft.  He played three seasons in the AAFC from 1946-1948 for the Chicago Rockets and Baltimore Colts.  He played in a total of 41 NFL games.  He was a versatile player, who scored 186 points gained over 4,000 all-purpose yards in three years of professional football—1,987 receiving, 1,042 on kickoff returns, 889 rushing, and 612 on punt returns.  He also had a 48-yard interception return, a 96-yard kickoff return, and an 89-yard punt return.  In 1948, his total of 970 receiving yards, and his average of 11.2 yards per touch was the best in the AAFC, and his total of 2,067 all-purpose yards was second best in the league.

See also
 List of NCAA major college yearly punt and kickoff return leaders

References

External links
 
 

1922 births
1994 deaths
All-American college football players
American football halfbacks
Baltimore Colts (1947–1950) players
Chicago Rockets players
Indiana Hoosiers football players
People from Vanderburgh County, Indiana
Players of American football from Indiana